Wancheng is a district of Nanyang, Henan.

Wancheng may also refer to the following places in China:

Wancheng, Hainan, a town in Wanning, Hainan
Wancheng Township, a township in Gaoyi County, Hebei
Wan Castle (Wancheng), located in present day Nanyang and known as the site of a battle between Cao Cao and Zhang Xiu in AD 197

See also
Wan Cheng (born 1985), Chinese footballer
Wangcheng (disambiguation)